Henry Edward Perenara (born 16 June 1980) is a New Zealand rugby league referee and former professional footballer who represented New Zealand. He is also the first NRL referee in history to send off a player for an alleged bite, he sent Kevin Proctor off in the Round 14 match of 2020, when Cronulla-Sutherland played against the Gold Coast.

Background
Perenara was born in Auckland, New Zealand.

He is a brother of Marcus Perenara and is a cousin of Sonny Bill Williams, and Hurricanes and All Blacks halfback TJ Perenara.

Early years
Attending Lynfield College, Perenara played for the New Lynn Stags and Bay Roskill Vikings and represented the New Zealand Secondary Schools team in 1998.

Playing career
In 1999, while under contract to the Warriors, Perenara played for Auckland North in the National Provincial Competition. He was part of the Glenora Bears side that dominated the Auckland Rugby League competition that year, winning the Roope Rooster, Ruataki Shield and Fox Memorial.

Perenara played for the Cronulla-Sutherland Sharks, St. George Illawarra Dragons, Melbourne Storm, Auckland Warriors and Parramatta in the National Rugby League competition.

Referee career
Perenara retired as a player in 2007 to join the National Rugby League's referee cadet programme. He made his first grade referee debut in 2011.

He was to make his Test debut on 6 October however the scheduled Test between the New Zealand national rugby league team and the Cook Islands was cancelled. Instead, Perenara's Test debut came on 29 October 2011 when he controlled the Four Nations match between England and Wales. He was named the 2011 New Zealand Rugby League's referee of the year. He is one of only four New Zealanders to play for New Zealand and referee a test match.

In mid April 2021 Perenara retired at the age of 40 due to a heart condition.
Perenara revealed to the Daily Telegraph he had been diagnosed with supraventricular tachycardia, an abnormally fast heartbeat that causes shortness of breath, dizziness sweating or fainting.

References

External links
Henry Perenara Official Player Profile
NRL player profile

1980 births
Living people
Auckland rugby league team players
Bay Roskill Vikings players
Cronulla-Sutherland Sharks players
Glenora Bears players
Melbourne Storm players
National Rugby League referees
New Lynn Stags players
New Zealand rugby league players
New Zealand rugby league referees
New Zealand Māori rugby league players
New Zealand Māori rugby league team players
New Zealand national rugby league team players
New Zealand Warriors players
Parramatta Eels players
People educated at Lynfield College
Junior Kiwis players
Rugby league five-eighths
Rugby league locks
Rugby league players from Auckland
Rugby League World Cup referees

St. George Illawarra Dragons players